Goniobranchus aurigerus is a species of colourful sea slug, a dorid nudibranch, a marine gastropod mollusc in the family Chromodorididae.

Distribution
This species was described from Quinns Rocks, near Perth, Western Australia. It has been reported from Indonesia.

References

Chromodorididae
Gastropods described in 1990